Kochaj tylko mnie  is a 1935 Polish romantic comedy film directed by Marta Flantz.

Cast
Lidia Wysocka - Lidia Relska / Hanka, Żarski's daughter
Kazimierz Junosza-Stępowski - Żarski
Witold Zacharewicz - Stefan Guzecki
Helena Grossówna - Lulu Bilska
Michał Znicz - Flamberg, revue manager
Władysław Grabowski - baron Hipolit Karcz
Barbara Gilewska - Relska's dresser
Stanisław Sielański - Piętek, Flamberg's secretary
Emanuel Schlechter - author
Józef Kondrat - messenger
Zbigniew Rakowiecki - dancer

External links 
 

1935 films
1930s Polish-language films
Polish black-and-white films
1935 romantic comedy films
Films set in Warsaw
Polish romantic comedy films